Mustafi is the surname of:

Cricketers
 Sisir Mustafi (born 1920), played for Bengal 1941–1950
 Ashoke Mustafi (born 1933), played for Bengal 1958/59

Footballers
 Nebi Mustafi (born 1976), Albanian–Macedonian, has played for various clubs, and for the Republic of Macedonia
 Nuri Mustafi (born 1983), Macedonian, plays for Brønshøj BK (Denmark)
 Orhan Mustafi (born 1990), Macedonian, plays for FC Le Mont (Switzerland)
 Shkodran Mustafi (born 1992), German, plays for Levante UD and formerly for the Germany national football team.